Éamonn mac An Cosnamhach Ó Dubhda  was an Irish Chief of the Name and Lord of Tireragh who died c. 1471.

Even when dates and/or lengths of reigns are given, they can only be approximated as some chiefs may have ruled in opposition to each other. 

Araile describes Éamonn as reigning for "five weeks and half a year".

References

 Araile do fhlathaibh Ua nDubhda/Some of the princes of Ui Dhubhda, pp. 676–681, Leabhar na nGenealach:The Great Book of Irish Genealogies, Dubhaltach Mac Fhirbhisigh (died 1671), eag. Nollaig Ó Muraíle, 2004–05, De Burca, Dublin.

External links
 http://www.ucc.ie/celt/published/T100005C/index.html

Medieval Gaels from Ireland
People from County Mayo
People from County Sligo
15th-century Irish people
Irish lords